Kakah Jub (also Romanized as Kākah Jūb and Kākeh Jūb; also known as Kāka Ju, Kākā Jūb, and Kākeh Jū) is a village in Yeylan-e Shomali Rural District, in the Central District of Dehgolan County, Kurdistan Province, Iran. At the 2006 census, its population was 289, in 69 families. The village is populated by Kurds.

References 

Towns and villages in Dehgolan County
Kurdish settlements in Kurdistan Province